Stanislav Smrek (born 1 December 1986 in Košice) is a professional Slovak football defender who currently plays for the 2. liga club MFK Zemplín Michalovce.

Career statistics

Last updated: 4 January 2010

External links
 
 Player profile MFK Košice profile
 Eurofotbal profile

References

Living people
1986 births
Slovak footballers
MFK Zemplín Michalovce players
FC VSS Košice players
FK Bodva Moldava nad Bodvou players
FC Silon Táborsko players
Slovak Super Liga players
Expatriate footballers in the Czech Republic
Sportspeople from Košice
Association football fullbacks